The Mount Hope Formation is a geologic formation of the Caribbean mouth of the Panama Canal Zone in Panama. The limestones, mudstones and siltstones preserve bivalve, gastropod (Monoplex comptus) and crustacean fossils dating to the Early Pleistocene. The formation is named after Mount Hope Cemetery, the burial ground for black West Indian immigrants who died working on the intercontinental Panama Railroad at the Panama Canal for the American Panamanian Railroad Corporation between 1850 and 1855.

See also 
 List of fossiliferous stratigraphic units in Panama

References

Bibliography

Further reading 
 A. P. Brown and H. A. Pilsbry. 1913. Two collections of Pleistocene fossils from the Isthmus of Panama. Proceedings of the Academy of Natural Sciences 493–500
 T. W. Vaughan. 1919. Fossil corals from Central America, Cuba, and Porto Rico, with an account of the American Tertiary, Pleistocene, and Recent coral reefs. Smithsonian Institution Bulletin 103:189–524

Geologic formations of Panama
Pleistocene Panama
Limestone formations
Mudstone formations
Siltstone formations
Lagoonal deposits
Reef deposits
Formations
Formations